Fametesta operculina is a species of air-breathing land snail, a small terrestrial pulmonate gastropod mollusc in the family Endodontidae.

This is an endangered species.

Distribution
This species (and the whole genus) is endemic to Japan.

References

Molluscs of Japan
Endodontidae
Taxonomy articles created by Polbot
Taxobox binomials not recognized by IUCN